Henricus van Beek (born 24 Mar 1816 in Amsterdam) was a Dutch clergyman and bishop for the Roman Catholic Diocese of Breda. He was ordained in 1842. He was appointed in 1874. He died in 1884.

References 

Dutch Roman Catholic bishops
1816 births
1884 deaths